At the conclusion of the NCAA Division I Men's Soccer Tournament (the "College Cup" tournaments), United Soccer Coaches selects two Most Outstanding Players: one for the Offensive Most Outstanding Player and the Defensive Most Outstanding Player. The MOP need not be, but is often a member of the Championship team.

Past winners 
An asterisk (*) next to a player's name indicates they did not play for the championship team.

NCAA Men's Division I Offensive MOP Award 

1959 – John Dueker, Saint Louis
1960 – Gerry Balassi, Saint Louis
1961 – Bill Killen, West Chester
1962 – Bob Trigg, Saint Louis
1963 – Pat McBride, Saint Louis
1964 – Jimmy Lewis, Navy
1965 – Carl Gentile, Saint Louis
1966 – Sandor Hites, San Francisco
1967 – Wally Werner, Saint Louis
1968 – Rocco Morelli, Maryland
1969 – Al Trost, Saint Louis
1970 – Denny Hadican, Saint Louis
1971 – Al Henderson, Howard
1972 – Dan Counce, Saint Louis
1973 – Dan Counce, Saint Louis (2)
1974 – Richard Davy, Howard
1975 – Andy Atuegbu, San Francisco
1976 – Andy Atuegbu, San Francisco (2)
1977 – John Young, Hartwick
1978 – Dag Olavson, San Francisco
1979 – Obed Ariri, Clemson*
1980 – Roar Anderson, San Francisco
1981 –  Bill Morrone, Connecticut
1982 – Paul DiBernardo, Indiana
1983 – John Stollmeyer, Indiana
1984 – Maxwell Amatasiro, Clemson
1985 – Dale Ervine, UCLA
1986 – Tom Stone, Duke
1987 – Bruce Murray, Clemson
1988 – Ken Snow, Indiana
1989 – Jeff Baicher, Santa Clara
1990 – Joe-Max Moore, UCLA
1991 – Claudio Reyna, Virginia
1992 – Claudio Reyna, Virginia (2)
1993 – Nate Friends, Virginia
1994 – Damian Silvera, Virginia
1995 – Mike Gentile, Wisconsin
1996 – Jesse Van Saun, St. John's
1997 – Seth George, UCLA
1998 – Aleksey Korol, Indiana
1999 – Yuri Lavrinenko, Indiana
2000 – Darin Lewis, Connecticut
2001 – Ryan Kneipper, North Carolina
2002 – Aaron Lopez, UCLA
2003 – Jacob Peterson, Indiana
2004 – Drew McAthy, UC Santa Barbara*
2005 – Jason Garey, Maryland
2006 – Nick Perera, UC Santa Barbara
2007 – Marcus Tracy, Wake Forest
2008 – Graham Zusi, Maryland
2009 – Jonathan Villanueva, Virginia
2010 – Scott Caldwell, Akron
2011 – Ben Speas, North Carolina
2012 – Steve Neumann, Georgetown*
2013 – Harrison Shipp, Notre Dame
2014 – Mac Steeves, Providence*
2015 – Jordan Morris, Stanford
2016 – Ian Harkes, Wake Forest*
2017 – Foster Langsdorf, Stanford
2018 – Amar Sejdič, Maryland
2019 – Daryl Dike, Virginia*
2020 – Jamil Roberts, Marshall
2021 – Isaiah Reid, Clemson
2022 – Nathan Opoku, Syracuse

NCAA Men's Division I Defensive MOP Award 

1959 – Jerry Knobbe, Saint Louis
1960 – Tom Hennessy, Saint Louis
1961 – Robert Malone, Saint Louis*
1962 – Ed Oswald, Saint Louis
1963 – Roger Rupp, Saint Louis
1964 – Myron Hura, Navy
1965 – Jack Gilsinn, Saint Louis
1966 – Mike Ivanow, San Francisco
1967 – Bill McDermott, Saint Louis
1968 – Mario Jelencovich, Maryland
1969 – Pat Leahy, Saint Louis
1970 – Ed Neusel, Saint Louis
1971 – Mori Diane, Howard
1972 – Bruce Arena, Cornell
1973 – Mark Demling, Saint Louis
1974 – Trevor Leiba, Howard
1975 – Peter Arnautoff, San Francisco
1976 – Peter Arnautoff, San Francisco (2)
1977 – Jeff Tipping, Hartwick
1978 – Andy Fry, San Francisco
1979 – Ed Gettemeier, SIUE
1980 – Andre Schweitzer, San Francisco
1981 – Erhardt Kapp, Connecticut
1982 – Pat Johnston, Duke*
1983 – Joe Schmid, Indiana
1984 – Joe Schmid, Indiana (2)
1985 – Paul Caligiuri, UCLA
1986 – Kelly Weadock, Duke
1987 – Tim Genovese, Clemson
1988 – Mike Anehauser, Indiana
1989 – Tony Meola, Virginia
1990 – Brad Friedel, UCLA
1991 – Jeff Causey, Virginia
1992 – Jeff Causey, Virginia (2)
1993 – Brian Bates, Virginia
1994 – Mark Peters, Virginia
1995 – Scott Lamphear, Wisconsin
1996 – Brent Sancho, St. John's
1997 – Matt Reis, UCLA
1998 – Nick Garcia, Indiana
1999 – Nick Garcia, Indiana (2)
2000 – Chris Gbandi, Connecticut
2001 – David Stokes, North Carolina
2002 – Zach Wells, UCLA
2003 – Jay Nolly, Indiana
2004 – Jay Nolly, Indiana (2)
2005 – Chris Seitz, Maryland
2006 – Andy Iro, UC Santa Barbara
2007 – Brian Edwards, Wake Forest
2008 – Omar Gonzalez, Maryland
2009 – Diego Restrepo, Virginia
2010 – Kofi Sarkodie, Akron
2011 – Isaac Cowles, Charlotte*
2012 – Luis Soffner, Indiana
2013 – Zack Steffen, Maryland*
2014 – Calle Brown, Virginia
2015 – Brandon Vincent, Stanford
2016 – Andrew Epstein, Stanford
2017 – Tomas Hillard-Arce, Stanford
2018 – Dayne St. Clair, Maryland
2019 – Dylan Nealis, Georgetown
2020 – Roman Celentano, Indiana*
2021 – George Marks, Clemson
2022 – Russell Shealy, Syracuse

References

External links 
 NCAA College Cup All-Tournament Team

College soccer trophies and awards in the United States
Most Outstanding Player
Awards established in 1959
Most valuable player awards
1959 establishments in the United States